Rufiji is one of the six districts of the Pwani Region of Tanzania. It is bordered to the north by the Kisarawe and Mkuranga Districts, to the east by the Indian Ocean, to the south by the Kilwa District, Lindi Region and to the west by the Morogoro Region.

The district name comes from the Rufiji River which runs through the district. The main ethnic groups that originate from the district are the Matumbi and Rufiji people. In the north is home to the Ndengereko people and on the delta are the Nyagatwa People.

According to the 2002 Tanzania National Census, the population of the Rufiji District was 203,102.

Wards
The Rufiji District is administratively divided into 19 wards:

 Bungu
 Chumbi
 Ikwiriri
 Kibiti
 Kiongoroni
 Mahege
 Maparoni
 Mbuchi
 Mbwara
 Mchukwi
 Mgomba
 Mkongo
 Mtunda
 Mwaseni
 Ngorongo
 Ruaruke
 Salale
 Umwe
 Utete
 Kilimani
 Kipugila
 Ngorongo

References

External links
 Rufiji Leprosy Trust

Districts of Pwani Region